Anri is both a masculine given name and a unisex Japanese and Abkhazian given name. Notable people with the name include:

Anri Grigorov (born 1964), Bulgarian sprinter
Anri Jokhadze (born 1980), Georgian singer
Anri Sala (born 1974), Albanian artist
Anri du Toit (born 1984), female vocalist of the South African Rap-Rave-Formation Die Antwoord

Abkhazian 
Anri Jergenia (1941–2020), Abkhazian politician
Anri Khagba (born 1992), Abkhaz-Russian footballer
Anri Khagush (born 1986), Abkhaz-Russian footballer

Japanese 
 (born 1961), Japanese singer-songwriter
, Japanese handball player
 (born 1982), Japanese singer-songwriter
 (born 1994), Japanese fashion model and actress
 (born 1983), Japanese singer-songwriter and former AV idol
 (born 1991), Japanese entertainer.
, Japanese voice actress
Anly (born 1997), Japanese singer-songwriter

Fictional characters 
, princess (and later queen) of Guardiana from the Shining Force series of video games
Anri of Astora, an NPC in the video game Dark Souls III
Anri Sonohara, a primary character in Japanese light novel and anime series Durarara!!
Anri (Fire Emblem), background character and ancestor of Marth

Japanese unisex given names
Masculine given names